Baker Lake is an alpine lake in Blaine County, Idaho, United States, located in the Smoky Mountains in Sawtooth National Forest.  The lake is most easily accessed via a trail from the end of forest road 162. The lake is located just east of Backdrop Peak and north of Baker Peak.

References

Lakes of Idaho
Lakes of Blaine County, Idaho
Glacial lakes of the United States
Glacial lakes of the Sawtooth National Forest